Gaby Junior Kiki (born 15 February 1995) is a Cameroonian professional footballer who plays for Sheriff Tiraspol.

Honours

Dinamo Brest 
 Belarusian Premier League: 2019

References

External links 
 
 

1995 births
Living people
Cameroonian footballers
Cameroonian expatriate footballers
Expatriate footballers in Belarus
Expatriate footballers in Moldova
Cameroonian expatriate sportspeople in Belarus
Association football defenders
Moldovan Super Liga players
Eding Sport FC players
FC Dnepr Mogilev players
FC Dynamo Brest players
FC Rukh Brest players
FC Sheriff Tiraspol players
Cameroonian expatriate sportspeople in Moldova
Footballers from Yaoundé